Antonio Segundo Durán Moreiras (born 1959), often credited as Antonio Durán "Morris", is a Spanish actor. A popular television actor in his native Galicia, he became regionally known due to his performance in series such as Pratos combinados.

Biography 
He earned recognition in Galicia for his television performance in the soap opera Pratos combinados, which ran from 1995 to 2006. He also starred in Padre Casares, Air Galicia, and Zapping Comando. A performer specialised in supporting roles in Spanish cinema, his film credits include performances in Continental (1990),  (1998), Mondays in the Sun (2002), Princesses (2005), Mataharis (2007),  (2011), A esmorga (2014), and Os fenómenos.

Filmography

Film

Television

Accolades

References 

Male actors from Galicia (Spain)
1959 births
Living people
21st-century Spanish male actors
Spanish male television actors
Spanish male film actors
Spanish male stage actors
People from Vigo